The 2016 Italian Athletics Championships was the 106th edition of the Italian Athletics Championships and were held in Rieti from 24 to 26 June 2016.

Champions

References

External links 
 Italian Athletics Federation

Italian Athletics Championships
Athletics
Italian Athletics Outdoor Championships